Philip Beauchamp Hanson (born 5 July 1999) is a British racing driver who currently competes in the  FIA World Endurance Championship and European Le Mans Series with United Autosports. He started his racing career when he won the Whilton Mill Club Championship in 2014, and has since gone on to claim the Super One British X30 Junior Karting Championship, the 2016–17 Asian Le Mans Series LMP3 Title, Dunlop Endurance Championship in 2016 (alongside an event win at the British LMP3 Cup), before becoming the youngest ever top-10 finisher at the famous Le Mans 24 Hour race (9th in LMP2 class). Phil secured a drive with United Autosports for the 2018 season, with his first competitive race at the Rolex 24 Hours at Daytona alongside two-time Formula 1 world champion Fernando Alonso, and current McLaren F1 driver Lando Norris. He won the 2018–19 Asian Le Mans Series title outright with Paul di Resta in an LMP2 Ligier entered by United Autosports, setting the standard as the youngest-ever overall champion in the series.

In September 2020 Phil followed this with victory in the LMP2 class in the delayed Le Mans 24 Hours, thereby securing the LMP2 title with a race in hand. By doing so, he, together with Filipe Albuquerque, became the first drivers to win the FIA World Endurance Championship (LMP2), European Le Mans Series and the Le Mans 24 Hours (LMP2) all in the same year. He is also the youngest driver ever to win a WEC title and the youngest British driver to win LMP2 at Le Mans.

Racing career 
Born in Sunningdale, Berkshire, Phil Hanson won his first championship at the age of 15, winning the Whilton Mill Club Championship with the BKC Racing team.

Subsequently, he went on to win the Super One British X30 Junior Karting Championship, again with BKC Racing, in 2015, registering multiple wins and podium positions.

2016 saw Phil, aged 17 at the time, race in his inaugural endurance racing season, joining the Tockwith Motorsports team for the Asian Le Mans Series. Alongside driver Nigel Moore, the pair were the only consistent two-driver crew of the season, resulting in the duo claiming the Driver's Championship in the LMP3 class, driving in the #26 Ligier JSP3.

Again teaming up for the Dunlop Endurance Championship, Phil and Nigel clinched the title in the final stage at Brands Hatch, with a second place finish enough to win the Championship although tied on 170 points with Jacob Mathiassen and Steve Fresle but clinching it due to their amount of class victories.

Phil capped off his 2016 season with a win in a British LMP3 Cup event at Snetterton, the first event of its kind in the UK. Hanson and Moore combined to achieve a pole position, which was converted into the win for Tockwith Motosport.

In June 2017, Phil become the youngest overall finisher in his Le Mans 24 Hour debut, finishing 9th in the LMP2 class and 11th overall in the twice-around-the-clock race. Phil was partnered by Nigel Moore and Karun Chandhok, racing a Ligier-Gibson JSP217.

Phil's 2017 schedule continued with 3 appearances in the FIA World Endurance Championship races: Spa; Le Mans and the Nürburgring, plus 3 more races in the European Le Mans Series at: Silverstone; Monza and Red Bull Ring.

In October 2017, Phil joined the United Autosports team for the 2018 season and finished 5th in the final European Le Mans Series standings, having achieved three podiums, including wins at Spa and Portimão, in the six-race series. He also contested three of the four Tequila Patrón North American Endurance Cup races. Having raced with Fernando Alonso and Lando Norris in the IMSA WeatherTech SportsCar Championship opener at Daytona, Phil had ex-F1 drivers Paul Di Resta and Bruno Senna as his co-drivers in United's Ligier at Watkins Glen having co-driven with Di Resta and Alex Brundle at Sebring. Unfortunately, the Ligier that Phil Hanson was sharing with Albuquerque at Le Mans crashed while in the hands of Di Resta.

Phil was the youngest Asian LMS champion, having been just 17 years of age when he won the LMP3 title in 2016–17 as well as being the youngest driver yet to record an overall victory in the European Le Mans Series, having won the 4 Hours of Spa in September 2018 with Filipe Albuquerque. He and Albuquerque went on to win the final race of the season, the Four Hours of Portimão on 28 October, and so finished 5th in the 2018 LMP2 ELMS Drivers' Trophy standings and establishing Hanson as the youngest-ever outright winner of an ELMS race.

Hanson raced a United Autosports entered Ligier JS P2 with Paul Di Resta in the 2018-19 Asian Le Mans Series. A 100% podium finishing record in the four-race series (1st Buriram, 2nd Shanghai, Fuji & Sepang), earned the British duo the overall title by 11-points.

Phil graduated from BRDC Rising Star status to a BRDC SuperStar in February 2019, and finished fourth in the 2019 ELMS driving with Filipe Albuquerque for United Autosports. For the first three rounds, Phil and Filipe raced a Ligier JSP217 but switched to an Oreca 07 for the final three races, scoring a win and second place.

In 2020 Phil has contested the FIA World Endurance Championship co-driving alongside Filipe Albuquerque and Paul di Resta, claiming victories at Bahrain, Austin, Spa-Francorchamps and Le Mans. Taking the win at Le Mans was also sufficient to secure the LMP2 title, making Hanson the youngest-ever WEC Champion. He will continue with United Autosports throughout the remainder of 2020, once again partnered by Albuquerque, in the European Le Mans Series. With three podiums already secured, including wins at Le Castellet and Spa-Francorchamps, the pair already leads the series. He also partnered  two time Formula One World Champion Fernando Alonso and future Mclaren Formula 1 driver Lando Norris at the  2018 24 Hours of Daytona

Racing record

Racing career summary

† As Hanson was a guest driver, he was ineligible to score championship points.
* Season still in progress.

Complete Britcar results
(key) (Races in bold indicate pole position in class – 1 point awarded just in first race; races in italics indicate fastest lap in class – 1 point awarded all races;-

Complete 24 Hours of Le Mans results

Complete Asian Le Mans Series results

Complete European Le Mans Series results

‡ Half points awarded as less than 75% of race distance was completed.

Complete IMSA SportsCar Championship results

† Points only counted towards the Michelin Endurance Cup, and not the overall LMP2 Championship.
* Season still in progress.

Complete FIA World Endurance Championship results

* Season still in progress.

References 

1999 births
Living people
24 Hours of Le Mans drivers
European Le Mans Series drivers
Asian Le Mans Series drivers
Britcar drivers
FIA World Endurance Championship drivers
WeatherTech SportsCar Championship drivers
United Autosports drivers
Le Mans Cup drivers